Evelyn Fauth (born 27 November 1976) is a former professional tennis player from Austria.

Biography
Fauth was born in the Styrian town of Sankt Peter, to parents Walter and Ingrid. She began playing tennis at the age of six and turned professional at 17.

Her biggest title win was the Espinho ITF tournament in 1999, which included a semifinal win over Kim Clijsters.

She appeared as a qualifier at the 2001 US Open and defeated Anne-Gaëlle Sidot to reach the second round, where she lost in three sets to Virginia Ruano Pascual.

In 2002, she debuted for the Austria Fed Cup team in a surprise win over the United States, away from home in Charlotte, North Carolina in the first round of the World Group. Prior to the tie, American star Jennifer Capriati was dismissed from the team for not complying with team rules, meaning that Fauth received a walkover win in the scheduled second match, giving Austria a 2–0 lead with Barbara Schwartz having already put them ahead by winning the opener. Schwartz then secured the tie for Austria in the third match, after which Fauth featured in two dead rubbers. She played a singles match against Monica Seles and partnered with Marion Maruska in the doubles rubber, losing both, to leave the scoreline at 3–2 in Austria's favour. Barbara Schett returned to the team for the quarterfinals, which left Fauth on the sidelines. Austria ultimately reached the semifinals.

She played two further Fed Cup ties in 2003, against Belgium away in Bree and Canada at home in Neudorfl.

Since retiring she remained involved in tennis as a coach. She was named Styria's "Coach of the Year" in 2015.

ITF Circuit finals

Singles (5–7)

Doubles (1–1)

References

External links
 
 
 

1976 births
Living people
Austrian female tennis players
People from Deutschlandsberg District
Sportspeople from Styria